The Bank Policy Institute (BPI) is an American public policy, research, and advocacy organization, based in Washington, D.C.

The organization was formed in July 2018 following the merger of the Financial Services Roundtable  and the Clearing House Association. BPI’s members include 42 banking institutions representing universal banks, regional banks, and foreign banks doing business in the United States. The current CEO is Greg Baer, a former litigator, corporate executive and public official who served as Assistant Secretary for Financial Institutions at the U.S. Department of the Treasury during the Clinton administration and as Managing Senior Counsel for the Federal Reserve Board of Governors.

History
The Association of Reserve City Bankers was formed in 1912 with 102 charter members and, in 1958, the Association of Registered Bank Holding Companies was formed due to the Bank Holding Company Act of 1956. In 1993, these two entities merged to form the Bankers Roundtable. The name of the organization was changed to the Financial Services Roundtable in 2000 to reflect a decision to broaden the organization's mission to include integrated financial service providers. In July 2018, Financial Services Roundtable merged with the Clearing House Association to form the Bank Policy Institute.

Parts 
In 1996, the newly-created BITS (Business Innovation Technology and Security division)  under the former Bankers Roundtable, allowed collaboration on technological issues faced by the financial services industry. Since the Roundtable's creation in 2000, this organization addresses "emerging threats and opportunities" especially threats to cybersecurity, fraud reduction and critical infrastructure protection. Another part of the Roundtable, the Bankruptcy Coalition, lobbied for changes to the bankruptcy code in 2005.

There are numerous other parts of the Roundtable. One part, Agents for Change, was described as helping move forward the "modernization" of insurance regulation. Another part tries to officially improve working communities of the financial services industry and creating partnerships with non-profits and politicians. The Housing Policy Council and 34 member companies, another part of the Roundtable 
are engaged in an "effort to prevent foreclosures and preserve homeownership." In addition to these sections of the Roundtable, there are three initiatives pushed: InFact (provide Americans with "information...important to the financial services industry), ITAC (non-profit that fights identity theft) and www.MyMoneyManagement.net (providing consumers with "financial education").

Leadership 
The organization’s board of directors is chaired by JPMorgan Chase & Co. Chairman of the Board and Chief Executive Office JPMorgan and is composed of the following financial services executives:

 Jamie Dimon, JPMorgan Chase & Co. (Chairman)
 Brian T. Moynihan, Bank of America
 Jean-Laurent Bonnafé, BNP Paribas
 Robin Vince, BNY Mellon
 Richard Fairbank, Capital One
 Jane Fraser, Citigroup
 Bruce Van Saun, Citizens
 Tim Spencer, Fifth Third
 Bryan Jordan, First Horizon 
 David Solomon, Goldman Sachs
 Stephen Steinour, Huntington
 René Jones, M&T Bank
 Kanetsugu Mike, MUFG
 John Turner, Jr.,  Regions
 William Rogers, Truist 
 Andrew Cecere, U.S. Bancorp
 Charles W. Scharf, Wells Fargo

Official mission, policy issues and connections

Official mission
Financial Services Roundtable is an advocacy organization for America’s financial services industry. FSR members include leading banking, insurance, asset management, finance and credit card companies in America.

Policy issues, positions 
According to their official website, the group focuses on financial services legislation, the regulatory issues and reduction of the federal deficit. More specifically, all of these issues "will be considered through the lens of uniform national standards and other core Roundtable principles." Such issues include:
Dodd-Frank Improvement Acts
Debit card
Cybersecurity
Fiduciary duty/retirement security
Financial literacy
GSE reform
Insurance reform
Corporate tax reform
Dodd-Frank Act implementation
Accounting standards/FASB
Capital and liquidity standards
"Reduction of Federal deficits over time" (a priority for the Roundtable)

Members
FSR has approximately a hundred members and membership is by invitation only.

Member companies include:

 Allianz Life
 Allstate Corporation
 Ally Financial
 American Honda Finance Corporation
 Ameriprise Financial, Inc.
 Ares Capital Corporation
 Associated Banc-Corp
 Assurant, Inc.
 AXA Financial, Inc.
 BancorpSouth, Inc.
 BancWest Corporation
 Bank of America
 Bank of Hawaii
 Barclays Investment Bank
 BB&T Corporation
 BBVA,
 BlackRock
 BMO Financial Corp.
 Brown & Brown Insurance
 Capital One Financial Corporation
 Caterpillar Financial Services Corporation
 Chubb Corporation
 CIBC Bank USA
 CIT Group, Inc.
 Citigroup Inc.
 City National Corporation
 Comerica Incorporated
 Commerce Bancshares, Inc.
 Discover Financial Services
 Edward Jones
 First Republic Bank
 Fifth Third Bank
 First Horizon National Corporation

 First Niagara Bank
 Ford Motor Credit Company
 Fulton Financial Corporation
 General Electric Company
 Genworth Financial
 Hanover Insurance Group, Inc.
 The Hartford
 HSBC USA
 Huntington Bancshares Incorporated
 IBERIABANK
 John Deere Financial Services, Inc.
 John Hancock Financial Services, Inc.
 JPMorgan Chase
 KeyBank
 Lazard
 Lincoln National Corporation
 LPL Financial
 M&T Bank Corporation
 MasterCard
 Mutual of Omaha Insurance Company
 Nationwide
 Northern Trust
 OneWest Bank
 People's United Bank
 PNC Financial Services
 Popular, Inc.
 Principal Financial Group
 Protective Life
 Prudential Financial

 Putnam Investments
 Raymond James Financial
 RBC Capital Markets
 RBS Citizens Financial Group, Inc.
 Regions Financial Corporation
 RenaissanceRe Holdings Ltd.
 Securian Financial Group, Inc.
 Sallie Mae
 Santander
 State Farm Insurance Companies
 State Street Corporation
 SunTrust Banks, Inc.
 Swiss Reinsurance America Corporation
 Synovus
 TD Bank
 Toyota Motor Credit Corporation
 Transamerica
 Trustmark Corporation
 TSYS
 Union Bank
 United Bankshares
 Unum
 U.S. Bancorp
 Visa Inc.
 Voya Financial
 Webster Bank
 Wells Fargo
 Western & Southern Financial Group
 Zions Bancorporation

Major Initiatives 
BPI was a vocal advocate for reforms to beneficial ownership requirements that would require the U.S. Department of Treasury Financial Crimes Enforcement Network to collect information from companies at the time of incorporation to determine who owns or has a financial interest in the company. The organization argued that this would help by making it harder for illicit actors to launder money through the U.S. economy.

A legislative fix, supported by BPI, passed in 2020 as a provision of the annual defense spending bill known as the National Defense Authorization Act.

Assets, lobbying and contributions

Assets 
The assets of the Roundtable were estimated to be between $10 and $49 million as of 2006. Of those assets, 42% was non-interest-bearing cash, 25% was savings and temporary cash investments, 11% was land, buildings, and equipment, 15% was other assets and 7% was investments in publicly traded securities. Most of the revenue (65%) coming into the Roundtable was from membership dues of participating organizations.

Lobbying
Lobbying has always been a focus of the Roundtable. From 1998 to 2000, less than a million dollars was spent on lobbying. But, by 2001 after the creation of the Roundtable, more than $1.1 million was spent. For the next five years, the amount of money spent on lobbying increased. In 2006, less than $6.2 million was spent on lobbying. The next two years, more money was spent on lobbying than in 2006: $6,380,000 was spent in 2007, and $7,760,000 was spent in 2008. The next year, the Roundtable spent about $6.9 million on lobbying in Washington, DC, with more than $900,000 going to outside lobbying firms. The Center of Responsive Politics showed a continuation of this trend. From 2008 to 2011, an average of about $7.5 million was spent on lobbying each year.

A good number of lobbyists representing the Roundtable have been involved in the revolving door between industry and government. Nine of them are part of the revolving door and one is a former congressman.

Political contributions
Even before its founding, the money contributed toward federal candidates has been spent. OpenSecrets notes that in the election cycles of 1990, 1992, 1994, 1996, and 1998, less than $90,000 was spent each year, with the highest amount in 1992 with about $85,200 spent. However, in the 2000s, the amount spent went up exponentially. An upward tick in the amount spent reached a high of $615,808 in the 2010 election cycle. Even with this increase, the money spent in the 2012 election cycle dropped almost by half.

The money spent from the 1990s to the present has not been given to just one party, but to both major parties in Washington, Democrats and Republicans. In the three election cycles from 1990 to 1994, Democrats were given more money than Republicans. In the late 1990s, that changed with more money being given to Republicans than Democrats (1996 and 1998 election cycles). This only increased in the 2000s, with more contributions being given than ever before, with a height of more than $266,200 given to Republican Party candidates in the 2008 election cycle. Still, Democrats were the runner-up, and were given the highest amount of money in the same election cycle: more than $214,400. In the 2012 election  cycle, $46,000 went to House Democrats, $122,000 to House Republicans and $36,500 to Senate Democrats and $38,000 to Senate Republicans. Such recipients include Speaker of the House John Boehner, House Majority Leader Eric Cantor, Maryland Congressman Steny Hoyer, Congressional Progressive Caucus member Xavier Becerra, senior Republican Senator Orrin Hatch, Senate Majority Leader Harry Reid, Senate Majority Whip Jon Kyl and many others.

See also
 Financial market
 Financial services
 European Financial Services Roundtable
 Business Roundtable

References

External links
 Bank Policy Institute
 Location of FSR

Advocacy groups in the United States
Trade associations based in the United States
Non-profit organizations based in Washington, D.C.
501(c)(6) nonprofit organizations